Tower Bends (in ) is a point on the Snaefell Mountain Course used for the Isle of Man TT races on the Snaefell Mountain Road, designated A18, in the parish of Maughold in the Isle of Man.

After Tower Bends, the climb continues to the Gooseneck and thereafter the start of the Snaefell Mountain section.

The S-bend corners at Tower Bends were part of the Highland Course and the Four Inch Course used for the Gordon Bennett Trial and Tourist Trophy car races held between 1904 and 1922. Tower Bends is now part of the Snaefell Mountain Course used since 1911 for the TT  and 1923 for the Manx Grand Prix races.

Name origin
During a Royal visit to the Isle of Man by Queen Victoria and Albert, Prince Consort aboard the Royal Yacht HMY Victoria and Albert on 20 September 1847, the Prince Consort was rowed ashore and landed at Ballure shore near Ramsey.  After climbing the Lhergy Frissell (from ), the Prince Consort viewed the nearby town of Ramsey and the northern plain of the Isle of Man. 

The site became known as Albert's Mount and in 1848 a tower in the Scottish baronial style was built on the site of granite and local slate of 45 feet (13.5 m) in height and 16 feet (4.9m) square at the base.

Sources

External links

Tower Bends
Corners of the Isle of Man TT